Young Farmers' Club may refer to:

National Federation of Young Farmers' Clubs in England & Wales
Regional clubs affiliated to New Zealand Young Farmers